Lobophyllia, commonly called lobed brain coral or lobo coral, is a genus of large polyp stony corals. Members of this genus are sometimes found in reef aquariums.

Species
This genus includes the following species:

 Lobophyllia agaricia (Milne Edwards & Haime, 1849)
 Lobophyllia corymbosa (Forskal, 1775)
 Lobophyllia costata (Dana, 1846)
 Lobophyllia dentata Veron, 2000
 Lobophyllia diminuta Veron, 1985
 Lobophyllia erythraea (Klunzinger, 1879)
 Lobophyllia flabelliformis Veron, 2002
 Lobophyllia grandis Latypov, 2006
 Lobophyllia hassi (Pillai & Scheer, 1976)
 Lobophyllia hataii Yabe, Sugiyama & Eguchi, 1936
 Lobophyllia hemprichii (Ehrenberg, 1834)
 Lobophyllia ishigakiensis (Veron, 1990)
 Lobophyllia radians (Milne Edwards & Haime, 1849)
 Lobophyllia recta (Dana, 1846)
 Lobophyllia robusta Yabe, Sugiyama & Eguchi, 1936
 Lobophyllia rowleyensis (Veron, 1985)
 Lobophyllia serrata Veron, 2002
 Lobophyllia sinuosa (Quoy & Gaimard, 1833)
 Lobophyllia valenciennesii (Milne Edwards & Haime, 1849)
 Lobophyllia vitiensis (Brüggemann, 1877)

References

Lobophylliidae
Taxa named by Henri Marie Ducrotay de Blainville
Scleractinia genera